Vyto J. Kab (born December 23, 1959 in Albany, Georgia) is a former American football tight end in the National Football League for the Philadelphia Eagles, New York Giants, and Detroit Lions.  Vyto attended the De Paul High School in Wayne New Jersey, where he was an all-state running-back, linebacker and Academic All-American.  Vyto was recruited by every major college football program in the country before playing for the Penn State Nittany Lions.  Vyto was drafted with the 78th pick of the 1982 NFL Draft by the Philadelphia Eagles.  Vyto was on the cover of Sports Illustrated in 1982, and had established himself as a starter by his second year with the Eagles. Kab was known as a dominating blocking tight end in the NFL.

Executive Profile

After football, Vyto joined his wife Patricia Kab, the founder of SleepTech, and went on to become the co-founder of the sleep disorders company. They served 26 different hospitals in the New York tri-state area, which at the time was the largest sleep disorder provider on the east coast.  Vyto was also the principal in a study of NFL players that was published in the New England Journal of Medicine.  Kab also serves as an investor, principal and consultant in other healthcare service and real estate-focused companies. Vyto serves on various boards including the Penn State Real Estate Board and the 'Max Cure' Pediatric Cancer Foundation.

Personal life
Married to Patricia Kab in which they share two daughters, Devon and Dillon Kab. 

1959 births
Living people
American football tight ends
Detroit Lions players
New York Giants players
Penn State Nittany Lions football players
Philadelphia Eagles players
Sportspeople from Albany, Georgia